The following railroads operate in the U.S. state of New Jersey.

Common Freight Carriers

Private Freight Carriers
Bayshore Terminal
FAPS
New Jersey and Northern Railway
PBF Energy

Passenger Carriers

Amtrak (AMTK)
New Jersey Transit Rail Operations (NJTR)
Port Authority of New York and New Jersey: Port Authority Trans-Hudson (PATH) and AirTrain Newark
Delaware River Port Authority: Port Authority Transit Corporation: PATCO Speedline (DRPA)
Southeastern Pennsylvania Transportation Authority: West Trenton Line and Trenton Line (SPAX)

Military Railways
United States Navy - serving the Naval Weapons Station Earle; junction with Conrail. The rail network starts in the Mainside area in Colts Neck, New Jersey and continues to the Pier Complex west of Leonardo, New Jersey, which extends over 2 miles (3 km) into Sandy Hook Bay.

Defunct Railroads

Private carriers
Langdon Mine
Lehigh and Oxford Mining Company

See also

 List of New Jersey railroad junctions
 List of New Jersey street railroads

Notes

References

 
 
New Jersey
Railroads